is a 1958 color Japanese film directed by Yasujirō Ozu which is based on a novel by Ton Satomi.

Plot
Wataru Hirayama (Shin Saburi) is a wealthy Tokyo businessman.  When an old schoolmate Mikami (Chishū Ryū) approaches him for help concerning his daughter Fumiko (Yoshiko Kuga), who has run off owing to a conflict with her father, he agrees.  Finding her in a bar where she now works, he listens to her side of the story.  Fumiko complains that her father is stubborn, insisting on arranging her marriage, whereas she has now fallen in love with a musician and is adamant to lead life her own way.

One day during work, a young man named Masahiko Taniguchi (Keiji Sada) approaches Hirayama to ask for the hand of his elder daughter, Setsuko (Ineko Arima).  Hirayama is extremely unhappy that his daughter has made wedding plans on her own.  He confronts her at home and says that she must not go to work until she sees the folly of her ways.  Hirayama tries to find out more about Taniguchi from his subordinate.

Owing to the standoff, his daughter's friend Yukiko (Fujiko Yamamoto) tries a ruse in which she asks Hirayama's opinion concerning a similar situation – her mother forcing her to marry someone she didn't like.  When Hirayama advises her to ignore her mother, Yukiko reveals it is all a setup and states that Hirayama has just given his consent to Setsuko's marriage.

Despite the ruse, Hirayama remains unchanged and Hirayama's wife Kiyoko (Kinuyo Tanaka) accuses her husband of being "inconsistent". Even his younger daughter Hisako (Miyuki Kuwano) is on the side of her sister, finding her father too old-fashioned.  Finally, after the couple's insistence on getting married, Hirayama decides to give in by attending his daughter's wedding.

After the wedding, Mikami reveals that he, like Hirayama, has agreed to let his daughter select her own marriage partner.  After going for a short business trip outside Tokyo, Hirayama decides to visit the newly-weds at Hiroshima by train, where Taniguchi is stationed by his company.

Cast 
 Ineko Arima - Setsuko Hirayama
 Fujiko Yamamoto - Yukiko Sasaki
 Yoshiko Kuga - Fumiko Mikami
 Shin Saburi - Wataru Hirayama
 Kinuyo Tanaka - Kiyoko Hirayama
 Miyuki Kuwano - Hisako Hirayama
 Chishū Ryū ... Shukichi Mikami
 Keiji Sada - Masahiko Taniguchi
 Teiji Takahashi - Shotaru Kondo
 Fumio Watanabe - Ichiro Nagamura
 Nobuo Nakamura - Toshihiko Kawai
 Ryūji Kita - Heinosuke Horie

Production
It is Yasujirō Ozu's first film in color, while Japan's first color film, Keisuke Kinoshita's Carmen Comes Home, had been released in 1951. Ozu chose Agfa film from Germany over Kodak or Fujifilm, as he felt that it conveyed red colors better. The meaning of "equinox flower" or "higanbana" of the title is the red Lycoris.

Shochiku requested that Ozu shoot Equinox Flower in color primarily to showcase Fujiko Yamamoto, the Daiei superstar it had borrowed for the film. The movie is constructed to spotlight the actress, who is elevated with extended dialogue scenes as a protégé of Hirayama who drives the plot resolution from the sidelines, and she won the 1958 Blue Ribbon Award as Best Actress for Equinox Flower and The Snowy Heron, which featured her in a much showier starring role. Yamamoto also receives what may be the only solo screen credit in any of Ozu's films, which starred some of the biggest names in Japanese cinema.

Release

Critical reception
Equinox Flower garnered 88% approval on Rotten Tomatoes, with an average rating of 7.4/10. Dave Kehr praised the film as "gentle, spare, and ultimately elusive, in a quietly satisfying way." Equinox Flower received four votes in the 2012 Sight & Sound critics' poll of the world's greatest films. Roger Ebert wrote, " In Equinox Flower, a Japanese film by the old master Yasujiro Ozu, there is this sequence of shots: A room with a red teapot in the foreground. Another view of the room. The mother folding clothes. A shot down a corridor with a mother crossing it at an angle, and then a daughter crossing at the back. A reverse shot in the hallway as the arriving father is greeted by the mother and daughter. A shot as the father leaves the frame, then the mother, then the daughter. A shot as the mother and father enter the room, as in the background the daughter picks up the red pot and leaves the frame. This sequence of timed movement and cutting is as perfect as any music ever written, any dance, any poem."

Home media
In 2011, the BFI released a Region 2 Dual Format Edition (Blu-ray + DVD). Included with this release is a standard definition presentation of There Was a Father.

References

External links
 Rotten Tomatoes Reviews
 
 
 1970 version of Japanese film poster
Equinox Flower at Ozu-san.com

1958 films
Films directed by Yasujirō Ozu
Shochiku films
Films with screenplays by Yasujirō Ozu
Films with screenplays by Kogo Noda